Revolution in the Air: Sixties Radicals Turn to Lenin, Mao and Che is a 2002 history book on the subject New Communist Movement within the United States.

Synopsis

Reception
Revolution in the Air was well received within socialist and Marxist circles, with Jacobin writer Ethan Young writing in 2018, praising the work as essential reading for understanding the New Communist movement. In contrast, Lorner Goldner of the anarcho-communist news website Libcom was far more critical, writing, "without exactly setting out to do so, Max Elbaum in his book Revolution In The Air, has managed to demonstrate the existence of progress in human history, namely in the decline and disappearance of the grotesque Stalinist- Maoist- 'Third World Marxist' and Marxist-Leninist groups and ideologies he presents, under the rubric New Communist Movement, as the creations of pretty much the 'best and the brightest' coming out of the American 1960's."  NCM veteran and former Theoretical Review contributor Paul Saba, gave the book a mixed review in Viewpoint Magazine.

References

Further reading

External links
Revolution in the Air product at Verso Books

2002 non-fiction books
21st-century history books
American non-fiction books
Books about Marxism
Works about Maoism
History books about the United States